Stephen Sene (born October 9, 1983 in Columbia, South Carolina) was an American football offensive tackle for the New England Patriots of the National Football League. He was originally signed by the St. Louis Rams as an undrafted free agent in 2008. He started his collegiate career at the University of South Carolina, but finished playing college football at Liberty University. Stephen was selected to play in the 2008 Hula Bowl in Honolulu, HI.

External links
New England Patriots bio

1983 births
Living people
Players of American football from Columbia, South Carolina
American football offensive tackles
Liberty Flames football players
St. Louis Rams players
New England Patriots players